The 1984–85 Indiana Hoosiers men's basketball team represented Indiana University. Their head coach was Bobby Knight, who was in his 14th year. The team played its home games in Assembly Hall in Bloomington, Indiana, and was a member of the Big Ten Conference.

The Hoosiers finished the regular season with an overall record of 19–14 and a conference record of 7–11, finishing 7th in the Big Ten Conference. Missing out on the NCAA Tournament, IU was invited to participate in the 1985 NIT; IU advanced to the championship game, but they lost to the UCLA Bruins.

Olympics
Prior to the start of the season, Bobby Knight was the head coach of the US Olympic Basketball Team at the 1984 Summer Olympics. Steve Alford was a member of the gold medal winning team. Hoosiers trainer Tim Garl was the trainer of the Olympic team.

Roster

Player stats

Schedule/Results

|-
!colspan=8| Regular Season
|-

|-
!colspan=8| NIT

Team players drafted into the NBA

References

Indiana Hoosiers men's basketball seasons
Indiana
Indiana
1984 in sports in Indiana
1985 in sports in Indiana